Chandra Ariati Dewi Irawan or better known as Ria Irawan (24 July 1969 – 6 January 2020) was an Indonesian actress and singer of Minangkabau descent.

Biography
Irawan began acting at age four, with her debut film being Sopir Taxi. Her breakout role was in the film Kembang Kertas in 1984. She was the daughter of actors Bambang Irawan and Ade Irawan. Her sister, Dewi Irawan, is also an actress.

Irawan died on 6 January 2020, after battling cancer since 2004.

Discography

Studio albums
 Hatiku Hatimu (with Rano Karno)
 Setangkai Bunga Anggrek (with Rano Karno)
 Hatiku Bagai Tertusuk Diri
 Cahaya Ilahi (with Opick)

Filmography

Film

Television

Awards and nominations

References

External links
  Ria Irawan: Berani Menantang Arus
 

1969 births
2020 deaths
Deaths from cancer in Indonesia
Indonesian actresses
20th-century Indonesian women singers
Minangkabau people
People from Jakarta